Norman Henry Pritchard, or N. H. Pritchard (October 22, 1939 – February 8, 1996), was an American poet. He was a member of the Umbra poets, a collective of Black writers in Manhattan's Lower East Side founded in 1962. Pritchard's poetry is considered avant-garde. His poems often include unconventional typography and spacing, as in "Harbour," or lack sentences entirely, as in " " ".

Biography
Pritchard was born in New York City. He studied for a B.A. degree at New York University, where he was president of his campus Fine Arts Society and an active contributor to his college's literary magazine. He did graduate work at Columbia University, and taught briefly at the New School for Social Research and was a poet-in-residence at Friends Seminary. During the years he was a member of the Umbra poets, his work appeared in magazines and journals such as Athanor, Liberator, Season, Negro Digest, Sail, Poetry Northwest, the East Village Other, and Gathering, as well as in several anthologies of African-American writing, including Walter Lowenfels's In a Time of Revolution (1969) and Natural Process, edited by Ted Wilentz and Tom Weatherly.

Pritchard's work was published in two books and three journals: The Matrix: Poems, 1960-1970 (Doubleday, 1970) and Eecchhooeess (New York University Press, 1971) New Jazz Poet(1967), The New Black Poetry(1969), and In a Time of Revolution: Poems from Our Third World(1969). As Richard Kostelanetz states: "Only one one-man collection of visual poetry, for instance, has ever been commercially published in the United States, even though 'concrete' is reportedly 'faddish'; and since that single book, N. H. Pritchard’s The Matrix (1970), was neither reviewed nor touted, it seemed unlikely that any others would ever appear—another example of how the rule of precedent in literary commerce produces de facto censorship."

Pritchard “stopped publishing in the early 1970s, and before his early death from cancer was residing in eastern Pennsylvania.”

References

External links 
N. H. Pritchard: books at Eclipse
On N. H. Prichard by Charles Bernstein (2004/2015), Jacket2
On N. H. Pritchard's The Matrix and Eecchhooeess. Recovery Project by Zachary Schomburg. Octopus Magazine.
 "Lost Books Month: Guest Writer stevenallenmay Discusses The Poetry Of N.H. Pritchard", The Devil's Accountant, June 17, 2010.

American male poets
Living people
1939 births
African-American poets
21st-century African-American people
20th-century African-American people
African-American male writers